Montauk derives from a place-name in the Mohegan-Montauk-Narragansett language. It can refer to:
 Montaukett, an Algonquian-speaking Native American group native to the eastern end of Long Island, though some were later exiled to Missouri

Montauk may also refer to:

Geography
 Montauk, Missouri, an unincorporated area on the Current River
 Montauk State Park (Missouri), a park near Salem, Missouri
 Montauk, New York, a hamlet in East Hampton, New York on Long Island
 Montauk County Park, a park near the hamlet of Montauk that has since been renamed Theodore Roosevelt County Park
 Montauk Downs State Park, a golf course in the hamlet of Montauk
 Montauk Point State Park, the New York state park where the Montauk Point Light lighthouse is located

Media
 Montauk (novel), a 1975 autobiographical novel by the Swiss writer Max Frisch
 Montauk Project (book) (titled: The Montauk Project: Experiments in Time), a book inspired by the tale of the Montauk Project
 "Montauk", a song by Rufus Wainwright from the album "Out Of The Game".
 "Montauk", a song by Bayside from their 2005 album "Bayside".
"Mr. Montauk", a song by Snarky Puppy from the album "GroundUP".

Structures
 Montauk (Clermont, Iowa), the home of William Larrabee, the 12th Governor of Iowa
 Montauk Building, a high rise building that existed from 1883–1902 in Chicago
 Montauk Point Lighthouse, the lighthouse on the eastern tip of Long Island
 Montauk Project, a supposed secret US government project involving time travel near the Montauk Point Lighthouse in some conspiracy theories
 Montauk, station of the Long Island Rail Road

Vessels
 , a small oil tanker formerly owned by Sealift Incorporated
 , a Civil War-era naval vessel in the United States

In other uses
 Montauk Mantis, a record label
 Montauk Monster, an unidentified beaked rodent-like creature whose corpse washed ashore on Long Island, New York in July 2008